Sir James William Ronald Macleay GCMG (1870 – 5 March 1943) was a British diplomat.

Biography
Macleay was educated at Charterhouse School and Balliol College, Oxford, and entered diplomatic service in 1895. He was appointed Second Secretary in November 1901. He served in Washington, D.C., Constantinople, Mexico City and Brussels, among other postings. He was Counsellor with the British Legation in Peking from 1914 to 1919 and was Ambassador to Argentina from 1919 to 1922. In 1922 Macleay returned to China becoming ambassador from 1922 to 1926.

His period as ambassador to China was criticized, and although Macleay was favorable to American ambassador John Van Antwerp MacMurray, it was not reciprocated; MacMurray described him as "a Tory of the type that neither imagined good could come out of any liberal ideas hatched at Washington under the auspices of the American rebels, nor perceived within China itself had been developing ideas which had already challenged and movements which had undermined British primacy." In 1927 he became British Minister to Czechoslovakia until 1929 and in 1930 until 1933 returned to his post as Ambassador to Argentina. He married Evelyn, daughter of Sir Robert Peel, 3rd Baronet, in 1901.

References
MACLEAY, Sir (James William) Ronald, Who Was Who, A & C Black, 1920–2007; online edn, Oxford University Press, Dec 2012

Ambassadors of the United Kingdom to Argentina
Ambassadors of the United Kingdom to China
Ambassadors of the United Kingdom to Czechoslovakia
1870 births
1943 deaths
People educated at Charterhouse School
Alumni of Balliol College, Oxford
Knights Grand Cross of the Order of St Michael and St George
Grand Crosses of the Order of the White Lion